Tetragramma is a genus of fossil sea urchins known from the Upper Jurassic (Oxfordian) to the Upper Cretaceous (Turonian).

Species
Species include:

 Tetragramma antsingyensis Lambert, 1936
 Tetragramma basabensis Vaziri & Arab, 2013
 Tetragramma besairiei Lambert, 1933
 Tetragramma bosei Jones, 1938
 Tetragramma cornueli Corroy, 1925
 Tetragramma depressum Vaziri & Arab, 2013
 Tetragramma donaldtrumpi Thompson, 2016
 Tetragramma giganteum Lambert, 1935
 Tetragramma hourcqi Collignon, 1950
 Tetragramma pomeraniae Kongiel, 1957
 Tetragramma tafermense Lambert, 1931
 Tetragramma tetratuberculatus Vaziri & Arab, 2013
 Tetragramma variolare (Brongniart, 1822)

References

Phymosomatoida
Prehistoric echinoid genera
Cretaceous echinoderms
Jurassic echinoderms